Nhà Bè is a suburban district of Ho Chi Minh City, the largest city in Vietnam. As of 2010, this district had an area of 100 km² and population of 103,793.

Geographical location
Nhà Bè borders District 7 to the north, Long An province to the south, Đồng Nai province to the northeast, Cần Giờ district to the southeast, and Bình Chánh district to the west.

Administration
Nhà Bè district includes the town of Nhà Bè and six communes:

References

Districts of Ho Chi Minh City